Curriculum and Instruction (C&I) is a field within education which seeks to research, develop, and implement curriculum changes that increase learner achievement in educational settings. The field focuses on how people learn and the best ways to educate. It is also interested in new trends in teaching and learning process. It tries to find answers to questions such as "why to teach", "what to teach", "how to teach" and "how to evaluate" in instructional process. Master's degrees and doctorates are offered at a number of universities.

References

Educational research